The Inyangani river frog (Amietia inyangae) is a species of frog in the family Pyxicephalidae.
It is found in Zimbabwe and possibly Mozambique.
Its natural habitats are subtropical or tropical high-altitude grassland and rivers.
It is threatened by habitat loss.

Sources

 C.Michael Hogan. 2012. Amietia inyangae. African Amphibians Lifedesk. ed. Breda Zimkus 

Amietia
Frogs of Africa
Amphibians of Zimbabwe
Amphibians described in 1966
Taxonomy articles created by Polbot
Fauna of the Eastern Highlands